Bandar Jasin Bestari (Jasin Smart City) is a residential neighbourhood in Bemban, Jasin District, Malacca, Malaysia developed by Malacca Customary Land Corporation (PERTAM).

Economy
 Mydin Hypermarket Bandar Jasin Bestari

References 

Jasin District
Populated places in Malacca